Ivry-sur-Seine is a commune in the Val-de-Marne department in the southeastern suburbs of Paris, France.

Paris's main Asian district, the Quartier Asiatique in the 13th arrondissement, borders the commune and now extends into the northern parts of Ivry. Asian commercial activity, especially Chinese and Vietnamese, has greatly increased in Ivry-sur-Seine during the past two decades. The commune contains one of the highest concentrations of Vietnamese in France, who began settling in the city in the late 1970s after the Vietnam War.

Politically, Ivry-sur-Seine has historically demonstrated strong electoral support for the French Communist Party (PCF). Between 1925 and today (except for the period of German occupation in World War II), the office of mayor was held by just four individuals: Georges Marrane, Jacques Laloë, Pierre Gosnat and Philippe Bouyssou, all members of the Communist Party.

Ivry-sur-Seine is twinned with Bishop Auckland in County Durham, England.

Name
Originally, Ivry-sur-Seine was called simply Ivry. The name Ivry comes from Medieval Latin Ivriacum or Ibriacum, perhaps meaning "estate of Eburius (the Latinized form of the Gallic patronym Eburos)", a Gallo-Roman landowner.

In 1897, the name of the commune officially became Ivry-sur-Seine (meaning "Ivry upon Seine"), in order to distinguish it from other communes of France also called Ivry.

History
On 1 January 1860, the city of Paris was enlarged by annexing neighbouring communes. On that occasion, about a third of the commune of Ivry-sur-Seine was annexed to Paris, and now forms the Chinatown area of the 13th arrondissement of Paris.

Ivry-sur-Seine is perhaps most famous as the place of execution of Jean Bastien-Thiry in March 1963. Richard Ellman also notes that James Joyce's daughter, Lucia, received psychiatric treatment in the commune's hospital in 1936 and was visited by both Joyce and Samuel Beckett.

Economy
Fnac has its head office in the commune. The head office moved there in 2008. E.Leclerc's head office is in the commune.

Transport
Ivry-sur-Seine is served by two railway stations on the Paris Métro Line 7: Pierre et Marie Curie and Mairie d'Ivry.

The east of the commune is served by Ivry-sur-Seine station on Paris RER line C with stops at the Bibliothèque Nationale de France and the city centre.

Orly Airport is located to the south of Ivry-sur-Seine.

Education 
Senior high schools:
 Collège et lycée Romain Rolland
 Lycée technique Fernand Léger

Colleges and universities:
 ESIEA (university)
 ESME Sudria 
 École des technologies numériques appliquées
 Institut polytechnique des sciences avancées
 IONIS School of Technology and Management

Images from Ivry

Demographics

Immigration

As of circa 1998 Ivry and Vitry-sur-Seine had a combined Asian population of 3,600. That year about 250 Asians from those communes worked in the 13th arrondissement of Paris, and the overall demographics of Ivry and Vitry Asians were similar to those in the 13th arrondissement.

Notable people
 Alla Ilchun, fashion model, a muse for Christian Dior
 Luc Abalo, handball player
 Nicolas Appert (1749–1841), inventor, spent a number of years in Ivry-sur-Seine
 Antonin Artaud, writer, died in Ivry-sur-Seine on 4 March 1948.
 Yohann Auvitu, ice hockey player
 Souleymane Bamba, footballer
 , economist and historian.
 Pierre-Claude-Victor Boiste (1765–1824), lexicographer and editor of the Dictionnaire universel de la langue française
 Yannick Bonheur, figure skater
 Pierre Contant d'Ivry (1698–1777), architect born in Ivry-sur-Seine.
 Mana Dembele, footballer
 Kadidiatou Diani, footballer
 Jean Ferrat, singer, spent a number of years in Ivry-sur-Seine before settling in Ardèche.
 Catherine Ferry, singer
 Reda Kateb, actor
 Tripy Makonda, footballer
 Dany N'Guessan, footballer
 Doriane Pin, racing driver
 Jean Renaudie, architect and founder of the Atelier de Montrouge who was responsible for the complete renovation of Ivry town centre.
 Bakary Sako, footballer
 , sociologist and writer.
 Maurice Thorez, former leader of the French Communist Party, elected deputy for d'Ivry-sur-Seine in 1932 until his death in 1964.
 Mickael Toti, basketball player 
 Makan Traore, footballer
 Bano Traore, athlete

See also

Communes of the Val-de-Marne department

References

External links

 Ivry-sur-Seine city council website (in French)

Communes of Val-de-Marne
Val-de-Marne communes articles needing translation from French Wikipedia
Little Saigons